Papi Gudia is a 1996 Indian Hindi-language horror film directed by Lawrence D'Souza, starring Karisma Kapoor, Avinash Wadhavan, Tinnu Anand and Shakti Kapoor. The film is heavily inspired by the American film series Child's Play and is an unofficial remake of the first Child's Play film (1988). The film flopped heavily at the box office.

Cast
 Karisma Kapoor as Karishma
 Master Amar Bhardwaj as Raju
 Avinash Wadhavan as Inspector Vijay Saxena
 Shakti Kapoor as Charan Raj (Channi)
 Razzak Khan as Jaggu, Channi's henchman
 Mohan Joshi as Raghavan
 Subbiraj as Police Commissioner 
 Tinnu Anand as Inspector Alluwalia's look-alike / A. Yadav died

Plot
A child murderer and black magic practitioner transfers his soul to a doll before death and wreaks havoc in the lives of the doll's new owners: a boy and his elder sister.

Soundtrack

References

External links 
 

1996 films
1990s Hindi-language films
Indian horror films
Films about witchcraft
Films about children
Indian horror film remakes
Indian mystery films
Hindi remakes of English films
Indian remakes of American films
Films directed by Lawrence D'Souza
1990s mystery films
Hindi-language horror films
1996 horror films